Walter Hughes Newton (October 10, 1880 – August 10, 1941) was a United States Representative from Minnesota; born in Minneapolis, Hennepin County, Minnesota; attended the public schools and was graduated from the law department of the University of Minnesota at Minneapolis in 1905; was admitted to the bar the same year and commenced practice in Minneapolis, Minnesota; first assistant prosecuting attorney of Hennepin County 1914 – 1918; elected as a Republican to the 66th, 67th, 68th, 69th, 70th, and 71st congresses, from March 4, 1919, until his resignation on June 30, 1929.

Congress 

Congress in 1928 and 1929 adopted what was known as the "Newton Bill," to divide the jurisdiction of the Eighth Circuit Court of Appeals, creating the Tenth Circuit, which sits in Denver.  This was the first change in the geography of the federal courts since the present system of courts of appeals was created in 1891.  The enormous Eighth Circuit had encompassed all the territory from the Mississippi  (except Texas and part of Louisiana) almost to the states of the West Coast.  Congressman Newton's plan resolved multiple disputes among the American Bar Association, the courts, and both Houses.  Newton's solution was to divide the states along a North/South boundary, creating the Tenth Circuit as encompassing Oklahoma, Colorado, Wyoming, Utah and New Mexico, thereby leaving a somewhat unified grouping of Eighth Circuit states sharing the Mississippi/Missouri river system, from Minnesota and the Dakotas to Arkansas.  The likeliest pre-Newton plan would have divided the circuit along a boundary from East to West.

After Congress 
Newton left Congress upon his appointment as personal secretary to President Herbert Hoover. He served in that capacity until March 3, 1933; regent of the Smithsonian Institution; appointed a member of the Federal Home Loan Bank Board by President Franklin D. Roosevelt in 1933 and served until 1934 when he resumed the practice of law in Minneapolis, Minnesota; also engaged as an author; unsuccessful candidate for election in 1936 to the 75th Congress; appointed Federal Referee in Bankruptcy in 1938 and served until his death in Minneapolis, Minnesota, August 10, 1941; interment in Lakewood Cemetery.

Sources

External links
 

Personal secretaries to the President of the United States
Baptists from Minnesota
University of Minnesota Law School alumni
1880 births
1941 deaths
Republican Party members of the United States House of Representatives from Minnesota
20th-century American politicians
20th-century Baptists